The Painters is the eighth EP by American experimental pop band Animal Collective, released on February 17, 2017. It is the first extended play released by the band since Monkey Been to Burn Town (2013). The EP serves as a companion to their 2016 studio album, Painting With.

Musical style
The Painters continues in the "synth-splattering" pop aesthetic of its polarizing predecessor Painting With.

The first track, "Kinda Bonkers", has been compared to its predecessor's opener "FloriDada". It has been noted for donning a "tribal pulse", musically and lyrically resulting in a piece of "outreach raga-rock."

Critical reception

The Independent rated the album 4 stars, calling it "possibly the perfect Animal Collective release".

Track listing

References

2017 EPs
Animal Collective EPs